This is a list of abbreviations commonly used in Ghana and previously in the Gold Coast

A

B

C

D

E

F

G

H

I

J

K

L

M

N

O

P

Q 

QUT=Quantity union Transfer

R 

Re=Rain earn

S

T

U

V

W

X

Y

Z 

Abbreviations
Ghana